Royal Republic is a Swedish rock band from Malmö. The band is currently signed to Universal Music and managed by Odyssey Music Network.

History

2007–2012: Foundation and We Are the Royal

Royal Republic was founded in 2007. Their first album, We Are the Royal, was recorded under the supervision of Swedish producer Anders Hallbäck in Malmö. The album was mixed at ToyTown Studios and completed with the help of Stefan Glaumann. On 6 August 2009, the record was released in Sweden and received wide acclaim from critics, fans and radio stations.

All three singles reached number 1 on Bandit Rock's Most-Wanted-List.  Three of the album's songs, Full Steam Spacemachine, I Must Be Out of My Mind, and 21st Century Gentleman, were featured on the soundtrack of F1 2011. Tommy-Gun also reached first place on the MTV Rocks charts. Royal Republic gained success in Germany through a collective tour with the Donots.

2012–2014: Save the Nation

On 24 August 2012 the band released their second album titled Save the Nation. It was recorded by Michael Ilbert at Hansa Studio 1 and Hansa Mix Room. Tom Coyne mastered the record at Sterling Sound in New York City.
Save the Nation was widely critically acclaimed and resulted in a better chart position than its predecessor We are the Royal.
The release of the album was followed by concerts in Australia, Great Britain, Germany, France and the Benelux countries. Through the support of bands like Social Distortion, The Subways, Die Toten Hosen and blink-182 the band earned major recognition.

In addition, Royal Republic played in 2013 at the tradition-rich German festivals Rock am Ring and Rock im Park.

2014–2016: Royal Republic and The Nosebreakers

In 2014 Royal Republic turned towards acoustic music. On 28 March the Swedes released Royal Republic and the Nosebreakers, on which songs from the previous albums We Are the Royal and Save the Nation were re-interpreted in an acoustic and country-like way. For the realization of the project, Adam Grahn, Hannes Irengard, Jonas Almén and Per Andreasson were assisted by studio musicians Daniel Olsson, Anders Svensson and Oskar Appelqvist. The latter even joined the band on the same tour.

All songs except This Means War were recorded at the Sunnana Studio by Markus Nilsson. They were largely mixed by Michael Illbert, who already mixed the previous record, at the Hansa Mix Room. This time the mastering was carried out at Chartmakers by Svante Forsbäck.
The accompanying tour for this acoustic album consisted of ten dates, which led the band to Germany, France, Switzerland, Czech Republic, Austria, Poland, and Sweden.

2016: Weekend Man

On 26 February 2016 Royal Republic released their fourth album, Weekend Man. Christian Neander and Michael Tibes were brought in as producers for this project. The latter was also responsible for the recordings that took place at Fuzzfactory in Berlin. Like their predecessors, Weekend Man was mixed by Michael Illbert at the Hansa Mix Room, and mastered by Tom Coyne of Sterling Sound.

2019: Club Majesty

On 31 May 2019 Royal Republic released 'Club Majesty'. It was produced by largely the same team as Weekend Man;  Christian Neander and Michael Tibes with the addition of Adam Grahn. Like its predecessor it was mainly recorded at FuzzFactory Berlin but also Vicious D. Licious Production Malmo. The album was taken out on the road commencing summer 2019 with the festival circuit (appearing on the main stage at Download) before a European cities tour in the autumn and winter.

Band members
Adam Grahn – lead vocals, rhythm guitar
Hannes Irengård – lead guitar, backing vocals
Jonas Almén – bass guitar, backing vocals, co-lead vocals on "I Don't Wanna Go Out"
Per Andreasson – drums, backing vocals

Discography

Studio albums

Singles
 "All Because of You" (2009)
 "Tommy-Gun" (2010)
 "Underwear" (2010)
 "Full Steam Spacemachine" (2010)
 "Addictive" (2012)
 "Everybody Wants to Be an Astronaut" (2012)
 "When I See You Dance With Another" (2015)
 "Baby" (2016) (#15 Mainstream Rock Songs)
 "Uh Huh" (2016)
 "Fireman & Dancer" (2019)
 "Boomerang" (2019)
 "Anna-Leigh" (2019)
 "Superlove" (2020)
 "Magic" (2020)
 "RATA-TATA" (2021)
 "Back From The Dead" (2021)
 "Diggin' It" (2022)

Compilation CDs
Also available on several compilation CDs including: 
 Bandit Rock #2 (2009) – disc 1, track 16
 Bandit Rock #3 (2010) – disc 1, track 8
 Sweden Rock #2 (2009) – disc 1, track 9
 Sweden Rock #3 (2010) – disc 1, track 3

References

External links

 Royal Republic Official Page
 Official Royal Republic Page with Music and More 

 
Swedish rock music groups
Musical groups established in 2007
Arising Empire artists